Ann Kristen Syrdal (December 13, 1945July 24, 2020) was an American psychologist and computer science researcher who worked with speech synthesis technology. She developed the first female-sounding voice synthesizer.

Early life 
Syrdal was born on December 13, 1945, in Minneapolis. Her father, Richard, was a physicist and engineer; her mother, Marjorie was a sales clerk. She was raised by her mother after her father died when she was two years old.

Career 
Syrdal became interested in psychology after helping with laboratory experiments involving rats, and subsequently completed a bachelor and then PhD degree in psychology.

After receiving her PhD, she began research work at the University of Texas at Dallas's Callier Center for Communication Disorders. In the early 1980s she received a five-year grant from the National Institutes of Health, and began studying the mechanics of human speech at Stockholm's KTH Royal Institute of Technology and the Massachusetts Institute of Technology.

After the grant ended, Syrdal took a job at AT&T Bell Laboratories. At the time, synthesized voices were primarily male. In 1990 she developed a system that could generate a female voice. In the 1990s she joined a project that developed a new method of speech synthesis; instead of creating the sounds artificially, the synthesis joined fragments of recorded speech to create new words and sentences. Sydral oversaw the initial recordings, of six women's voices. In 1998, AT&T's "Natural Voices" system won an international competition for speech synthesizers, using a female voice.

She was named a fellow of the Acoustical Society of America in 2008, for her work in female speech synthesis.

Syrdal died of cancer on July 24, 2020, in San Jose, California.

Personal life 
Syrdal married and divorced three times; at the time of her death she had been in a domestic partnership for 23 years. She had three children, a son and two daughters.

References 

1945 births
2020 deaths
American women psychologists
Deaths from cancer in California
Fellows of the Acoustical Society of America
Human–computer interaction researchers
Scientists from Minneapolis
University of Minnesota alumni
Scientists at Bell Labs
21st-century American women